The Termit Massif (Termit Mountains or simply the Termit) is a mountainous region in southeastern Niger. Just to the south of the dunes of Tenere desert and the Erg of Bilma, the northern areas of the Termit, called the Gossololom consists of black volcanic peaks which jut from surrounding sand seas.  The southern Termit is a roughly east–west range of heavily eroded black sandstone. Its foothills on the south west are the Koutous hills.

Human settlement
The small population of the Termit is mostly nomadic, with Toubou settlements in the north and east, and more Tuareg and Diffa Arabs to the west. Covering much of the north of the Zinder and Diffa Regions, there are few permanent settlements or all weather roads in the area.  Communities within the region include Termit Kaoboul in the south centre and Kandil Bouzou in the southeast. Neighbouring settlements include Tasker, Abourak and Haltouma to the southwest; Béla Hardé to the southeast, and Koussa Arma, Oyou Bezezé Denga, and Agadem on the eastern fringe. Settled communities on the south west fringe are largely Hausa, and to the south east Kanuri. The large Kanuri town of N'guigmi is to the southeast and the Hausa cities of Goure and Zinder are to the southwest.

Ecological protection
Termit is home to the Termit Massif Reserve, a 700,000 hectare faunal reserve established in 1962 to protect endangered antelope and Addax populations.

In 2006, the government of Niger applied to UNESCO to have the Termit Massif area named a UNESCO World Heritage Site.

References

Geography of Niger